Wojciech Żywny (May 13, 1756February 21, 1842) was a Czech-born Polish pianist, violinist, teacher and composer.  He was Frédéric Chopin's first professional piano teacher.

Life 
Żywny was born in Mšeno, Bohemia, and became a pupil of Jan Kuchař.  As a youth, during the reign of Stanisław August Poniatowski, he moved to Poland to become the music tutor to the children of Princess Sapieha.  He later moved to Warsaw.

He was the first professional piano teacher of Frédéric Chopin, who received lessons from him between 1816 and 1821. Żywny instilled in Chopin a lasting love of Bach and Mozart.  Chopin's piano skills soon surpassed those of his respected teacher. In 1821, eleven-year-old Chopin dedicated a Polonaise in A-flat major to Żywny as a name-day gift.

Żywny died in 1842, aged 85, in Warsaw.

Works 
Żywny wrote many pieces for piano, violin, as well as orchestral works, few of which are known or published today.  They show refined mastery of the classical style, with definite romantic influences.  Another influence on his music was Central European folk music.

Notes

References 
 Zdzisław Jachimecki, "Chopin, Fryderyk Franciszek," Polski słownik biograficzny, vol. III, Kraków, Polska Akademia Umiejętności, 1937, pp. 420–26.

External links 
  Portrait of Wojciech Żywny by Ambroży Mieroszewski, 1829
 Chopin's teachers  (in Polish)

1756 births
1842 deaths
18th-century Bohemian musicians
18th-century Polish–Lithuanian musicians
Czech music educators
Czech classical pianists
Czech classical violinists
Czech classical composers
Male classical violinists
Polish music educators
Piano pedagogues
Polish classical pianists
Polish classical composers
Male classical pianists
Polish people of Czech descent
Polish violinists
Frédéric Chopin
People from Mělník District